Farmen 2021 (The Farm 2021) is the fourteenth season of the Swedish version of The Farm reality television show. 17 contestants arrived on the farm where they have to complete tasks in order to help win equipment and food. Each week, two contestants are chosen to duel where the winner remains and the loser has to leave the farm. This season is the first to be hosted by Anna Brolin who appears alongside the returning farm mentor, Hans Wincent. The season premieres on 10 January 2021 on TV4.

Finishing order
(age are stated at time of competition)

The game

References

External links

The Farm (franchise)
2021 Swedish television seasons